Phelsuma pronki is a critically endangered diurnal species of gecko, a lizard in the family Gekkonidae. The species is endemic to central Madagascar, and threatened by severe habitat loss and collection for the international pet trade. It typically inhabits rainforests, dwells on trees, and feeds on insects and nectar.

Etymology
The specific name, pronki, is in honor of Dutch naturalist Olaf Pronk.

Description
P. pronki belongs to the smallest day geckos. The body colour is greyish, and the head is yellow. Four serrated black stripes extend from the snout to the tail. The extremities are blackish with grey speckles. A yellow eye ring is present.

Geographic range
P. pronki inhabits the rainforest of the highland of central Madagascar near Andramasina.

Habitat
The habitat of Phelsuma pronki is rainy and very moist. There is a huge difference in temperature between night and day and between the different seasons.

Diet
P. pronki feeds on various insects, other invertebrates, and nectar.

Reproduction
The females of P. pronki glue their eggs under loose bark.

Captivity
This critically endangered species is still wild-caught for the international pet trade. It can be captive-bred by experts.

Phelsuma pronki should be housed in pairs and need a well-planted terrarium which should provide many places to hide. It is important that there are some spot lights for basking. The humidity should be maintained between 75 and 100%. In captivity, these animals can be fed with crickets, wax moth larvae, fruit flies, mealworms, and houseflies.

References

Further reading
Henkel, Friedrich-Wilhelm; Schmidt, Wolfgang (1995). Amphibien und Reptilien Madagaskars, der Maskarenen, Seychellen und Komoren. 311 pp. Stuttgart: Ulmer. . (in German).
McKeown, Sean (1993). The general care and maintenance of day geckos. Lakeside, California: Advanced Vivarium Systems.
Rösler H (2000). "Kommentierte Liste der rezent, subrezent und fossil bekannten Geckotaxa (Reptilia: Gekkonomorpha)". Gekkota 2: 28-153. (Phelsuma pronki, p. 103). (in German).
Seipp, Robert (1994). "Eine neue Art der Gattung Phelsuma Gray 1825 aus Zentral-Madagaskar (Reptilia: Sauria: Gekkonidae)". Senckenbergiana biologica, Frankfurt 74 (1–2): 193-197. (Phelsuma pronki, new species). (in German).

Phelsuma
Reptiles described in 1994
Endemic fauna of Madagascar
Reptiles of Africa
Species endangered by the pet trade
Reptiles as pets